The Zimbabwe women's national rugby union team are a national sporting side of Zimbabwe, representing them at rugby union. The side first played in 2007.

History
Zimbabwe's women's team are known as the Women Sables. They played mostly friendlies with Zambia and Botswana before they played their first international test match on 22 September 2007 against Zambia at the Harare Sports Club.

Results summary
(Full internationals only)

Results

Full internationals

Other matches

References

External links
 Zimbabwe Rugby Union
 Zimbabwe at World Rugby

African national women's rugby union teams
Rugby union in Zimbabwe
Women's national rugby union teams
Zimbabwe national rugby union team